Irwin's turtle (Elseya irwini) is a rare species of freshwater turtle in the family Chelidae. The species is endemic to Australia, originating from the lower region of the Burdekin River area in northern Queensland, and was named after conservationist and television personality Steve Irwin.

Discovery

Steve Irwin and his father, naturalist Bob Irwin, caught a female specimen of E. irwini on a crocodile-catching trip on the Burdekin River in 1990, on a fishing line. Steve Irwin took pictures and sent them to turtle expert John Cann, who verified that it was indeed a new species. The new species was named after Steve Irwin.

Description
The female of the species E. irwini has a pale head with a yellowish horny sheath on the crown. The pale color present in the female of this species is due to a lack of multiple pigments which affect essentially all parts of the body.  These individuals are known for their sturdy skull, which is supported by a narrow muscle called the pterygoid, creating a shielding for the skull and providing normal jaw functions.

Respiration
E. irwini, like some other turtles, can breathe underwater by taking water into its cloaca. The cloaca is a cavity at the end of the digestive tract containing a chamber with gill-like structures which allow for the diffusion of oxygen. Without this structure, this species of turtle would not be able to stay under water for long periods of time. Irwin's turtle needs to live in a source of water that is plentiful with oxygen. If the water has low oxygen levels or is filled with contaminants, the turtle has a lower chance of survival.

Threats

The habitat of the Irwin's turtle has been impacted by the construction of the Burdekin Dam, which has caused a decline in water quality of the Burdekin River, which makes it hard for this species to survive and reproduce. Plans for the construction of Urannah Dam have been opposed, as this would cause further impacts and habitat contraction.

Habitat and conservation status
The turtle has been plentiful in Broken River and Bowen Creek. It had not been observed in the Lower Burdekin River in the 20 years preceding May 2022, until its presence was officially confirmed by researchers from James Cook University led by Cecilia Villacorta Rath.

The species has not been listed under the Environment Protection and Biodiversity Conservation Act 1999 (EPBC Act) owing to lack of data on the species.

See also
 List of organisms named after famous people (born 1950–present)

Footnotes

References

External links

 
Elseya irwini in the Australian Faunal Directory
Picture of the head of the Elseya irwini
Picture of the shell of the Elseya irwini
Concern for Irwin's bum-breathing turtle | NEWS.com.au 
Irwin's turtles at Urannah 

Elseya (Pelocomastes)
Reptiles described in 1997
Turtles of Australia
Steve Irwin